Fancy Ultra•Fresh is the second studio album by American electronic band Freezepop. It was released on April 20, 2004 by The Archenemy Record Company.

The enhanced CD features a set of audio visualizers playable with the album, a link to the official Freezepop website, the bonus song "#1 Song in Heaven" and three videos, including a flash video for "Stakeout", a live television performance of "Bike Thief" from The Top Shelf Variety Hour and a "Freezepop on Tour" featurette.

A limited edition release of the album had the CD encased in a lime green gel liquid-pack.

The robotic voice spelling the word "Freezepop" at the beginning of "I Am Not Your Gameboy" was produced by a Speak & Spell. The album's hidden track is a cover of the theme song to animated series Jem.

Remixed versions of "Stakeout" and "Bike Thief" appear in the video games Dance Dance Revolution Ultramix 3 and Downhill Domination, respectively. The song "I Am Not Your Gameboy" appears in Guitar Hero: On Tour.

There is a remixed version of the song "Manipulate", which previously appeared in their EP, Fashion Impression Function.

Track listing

Personnel
 The Duke – producer, engineer, mixing
 Jussi Gamache – design
 Dave Locke – mastering
 Violet Shuraka – photography

References

2004 albums
Freezepop albums